The Battle of Bamber Bridge is the name given to an outbreak of racial violence involving American soldiers stationed in the village of Bamber Bridge, Lancashire, in Northern England during the Second World War. Tensions had been high following a failed attempt by US commanders to racially segregate pubs in the village, and worsened after the 1943 Detroit race riot. The battle started when white American Military Police (MPs) attempted to arrest several African American soldiers from the racially segregated 1511th Quartermaster Truck Regiment, at the Ye Olde Hob Inn public house in Bamber Bridge for being out of uniform. 

In a confrontation on the street afterwards, a white MP shot and killed Private William Crossland. More military police then arrived armed with machine guns and grenades, and black soldiers armed themselves with rifles from their base armoury for protection. Both sides exchanged fire through the night. Although a court martial convicted 32 African American soldiers of mutiny and related crimes, poor leadership and the racist attitudes of the MPs was acknowledged as a cause.

Background
During the Second World War, Bamber Bridge hosted American servicemen from the 1511th Quartermaster Truck regiment, part of the Eighth Air Force. Their base, Air Force Station 569 (nicknamed "Adam Hall"), was on Mounsey Road, part of which still exists now as home to 2376 (Bamber Bridge) Squadron of the Royal Air Force Air Cadets. The 1511th Quartermaster Truck was a logistics unit, and its duty was to deliver materiel to other Eighth Air Forces bases in Lancashire. The 234th US Military Police Company were also in the town, on its north side.

The US Armed Forces were still racially segregated, and the soldiers of 1511 Quartermaster Truck were almost entirely black, and all but one of the officers were white, as were the MPs. Military commanders tended to treat the service units as "dumping grounds" for less competent officers, and the leadership in the unit was poor. Racial tensions were exacerbated by the race riots in Detroit earlier that week, which had led to 34 deaths, including 25 black casualties. The people of Bamber Bridge supported the black troops, and when US commanders demanded a colour bar in the town, all three pubs in the town reportedly posted "Black Troops Only" signs.

Outbreak of violence
On the evening of 24 June 1943, some soldiers from the 1511th Quartermaster Truck Regiment were drinking with the English townsfolk in Ye Olde Hob Inn. Details of how the incident developed differ between sources.

Two MPs, Corporal Roy A. Windsor and Private First Class Ralph F. Ridgeway, responded to a report of trouble at a local pub. The MPs had standing orders to arrest soldiers who were out of camp without a pass, were disorderly, or were not in proper uniform. On entering the pub, they encountered one soldier, Private Eugene Nunn who was dressed in a field jacket rather than the required class A uniform, and asked him to step outside. An argument ensued, with local people and British servicewomen of the Auxiliary Territorial Service siding with Nunn. One British soldier challenged the MPs by saying, "Why do you want to arrest them? They're not doing anything or bothering anybody."

Staff Sergeant William Byrd, who was black, defused the situation but, as the MPs left, a beer was thrown at their jeep. After the MPs picked up two reinforcements, they spoke to Captain Julius F. Hirst and Lieutenant Gerald C. Windsor, who told the MPs to do their duty and to arrest the black soldiers. A group of MPs intercepted the soldiers on Station Road as they returned to their base at Mounsey Road. As a fight broke out, the MPs opened fire, and one bullet struck Private William Crossland of the 1511th in the back and killed him.

Some of the injured black soldiers returned to their base, but the killing caused panic as rumours began to spread that the MPs were out to shoot black soldiers. Although the colonel was absent, acting CO Major George C. Heris did his best to calm the situation. Lieutenant Edwin D. Jones, the unit's only black officer, managed to persuade the soldiers that Heris would be able to round up the MPs and see that justice was done.

However, at midnight, several jeeps full of MPs arrived at the camp, including one improvised armoured car armed with a large machine gun. That prompted black soldiers to arm themselves with weapons. Around two thirds of the rifles were taken, and a large group left the base in pursuit of the MPs. British police officers reported that the MPs set up a roadblock and ambushed the soldiers.

The black soldiers warned the townsfolk to stay inside when a firefight broke out between them and the MPs, which resulted in seven wounded. The fighting stopped around 04:00 the next morning with an officer, three black soldiers, and one MP having been shot and two other MPs beaten. Eventually, the soldiers returned to the base, and by the afternoon, all but four rifles had been recovered.

Arrests and courts-martial
By one later account, the violence left one man dead and seven people (five soldiers and two MPs) injured. Although a court martial convicted 32 black soldiers of mutiny and related crimes, poor leadership and racist attitudes among the MPs was blamed as the cause.

Two trials were conducted. In August, four of the black soldiers involved in the initial brawl were sentenced to hard labour, one to two and a half years and the others to three, and all to dishonourable discharges, with one of those convictions being overturned on review. The second trial involved 35 defendants. It concluded on 18 September with seven acquittals and 28 convictions. Sentences for those convicted ranged from three months to 15 years, with seven sentences of 12 years or more. Reviews resulted in the release of one man and reductions in all other sentences. Fifteen of the men returned to duty in June 1944 and six other sentences were further reduced. The defendant with the longest sentence returned to duty after serving 13 months.

General Ira C. Eaker, commander of the Eighth Air Force, placed most of the blame for the violence on the white officers and MPs because of their poor leadership and use of racial slurs. To prevent similar incidents happening again, he combined the trucking units into a single special command. The ranks of that command were purged of inexperienced or racist officers, and the MP patrols were racially integrated. Morale among black troops stationed in England improved, and the rates of courts-martial fell. Although there were several more racial incidents between black and white American troops in Britain during the war, none was on the scale of that of Bamber Bridge.

Reports of the mutiny were considerably censored, with newspapers disclosing only that violence had occurred in a town somewhere in North West England. The author Anthony Burgess, who lived in the Bamber Bridge area after the war, wrote about the event briefly in The New York Times in 1973 and in his autobiography, Little Wilson and Big God.

Popular interest in the event increased in the late 1980s after a maintenance worker discovered bullet holes from the battle in the walls of a Bamber Bridge bank.

Commemoration
In June 2013, to commemorate the 70th anniversary of the incident, the University of Central Lancashire held a symposium. It included a screening of the 2009 documentary Choc'late Soldiers from the USA  which was produced by Gregory Cooke, and a performance of Lie Back and Think of America, a play written by Natalie Penn of Front Room, which had played at the Edinburgh Fringe Festival.

In June 2022, a memorial garden commemorating the battle was created opposite the pub where the Battle of Bamber Bridge started. The incident inspired the plot of the film The Railway Children Return.

See also
 Freeman Field mutiny
 African-American mutinies in the United States Armed Forces

Notes

References

 

1943 in England
1943 riots
Battles involving Lancashire
June 1943 events
Mutinies
Race riots in England
Events that led to courts-martial
Military discipline and World War II